The 2015 World RX of Norway (formally the 2015 NAF World RX of Norway) was the eighth round of the second season of the FIA World Rallycross Championship. The event was held at the Lånkebanen in Hell, Nord-Trøndelag.

Heats

Semi-finals

World Championship

Semi-final 1

Semi-final 2

European Championship

Semi-final 1

Semi-final 2

Finals

World Championship

European Championship

Standings after the event

World Championship standings

European Championship standings

 Note: Only the top five positions are included for both sets of standings.

References

External links

|- style="text-align:center"
|width="35%"|Previous race:2015 World RX of Canada
|width="30%"|FIA World Rallycross Championship2015 season
|width="35%"|Next race:2015 World RX of France
|- style="text-align:center"
|width="35%"|Previous race:2014 World RX of Norway
|width="30%"|World RX of Norway
|width="35%"|Next race:2016 World RX of Norway
|- style="text-align:center"

Norway
World RX